Robert Bunker III (born September 8, 1988) is an American professional racing driver. He most recently competed part-time in a sprint car racing series in 2008. Most notably, he ran part-time in the ARCA Re/Max Series in 2007, driving the No. 4 Dodge for Cunningham Motorsports. Prior to that, Bunker competed in the Star Mazda Championship and Formula BMW Series.

Racing career
Bunker began kart racing in 1998. He won his first track championship in 1999, and would follow that up with another one in 2001. In 2000, Bunker began competing on a national level in the World Karting Association, securing three national event wins by 2003. 

In 2004, he competed in four Formula TR (Formula Renault 1600) events scoring one qualifying pole and two podium finishes in only 4 events. In 2005, Bunker competed in the Formula BMW USA championship for AIM Autosport, finishing 8th in points. That year, he was teammates with current NASCAR Pinty's Series driver Kevin Lacroix. He moved to the Star Mazda Series in 2006 with AIM and finished 13th in points with one podium finish.

In 2007, Bunker signed with Cunningham Motorsports and Dodge's driver development program to compete in seven ARCA Re/Max Series races, driving their No. 4 car. He had previously debuted for the team in a test session in November 2006. He finished the season 46th in points with a best finish of 12th at Pocono Raceway.

Bunker did not return to the Cunningham team or the ARCA Series altogether in 2008. That year, he joined the Ventura Racing Association (VRA) Sprint Car Series, competing in nine races for Cory Kruseman Racing.

Personal life
Bunker is from Bridgewater Township, New Jersey and graduated from Bridgewater-Raritan High School.

Motorsports career results

ARCA Re/Max Series
(key) (Bold – Pole position awarded by qualifying time. Italics – Pole position earned by points standings or practice time. * – Most laps led.)

References

External links
  Dead link
 
  

1988 births
ARCA Menards Series drivers
Formula BMW USA drivers
Indy Pro 2000 Championship drivers
Living people
People from Bridgewater Township, New Jersey
Racing drivers from New Jersey
Sportspeople from Somerset County, New Jersey